Reece Frederick James Burke (born 2 September 1996) is an English professional footballer who plays as a defender for  club Luton Town. A product of the West Ham United youth system, Burke has also played for Bradford City, where he was the player of the season for the 2015–16 season, and Bolton Wanderers. Internationally he has played for the England Under-18 team, England Under-19 team and England Under-20 team. Burke mainly plays centre back, he can also play right back.

Career

West Ham United

Burke joined the West Ham junior team age nine and played youth team football. He made his official debut on 5 January 2014 for West Ham against Nottingham Forest at The City Ground in the FA Cup. Forest won the game 5–0. Burke's first goal for the club came in a pre-season friendly at the Boleyn Ground against Sampdoria. He scored the winning goal in the 90th minute following a cross from fellow youth graduate Elliot Lee's cross. Burke then played the full 120 minutes against Sheffield United in the League Cup second round, with West Ham being eliminated in a penalty shootout. Burke made his Premier League debut on 25 April 2015 in a 0–0 away draw against Queens Park Rangers.

Loan to Bradford City

On 20 August 2015, Burke signed for League One side Bradford City on a one-month loan. On 5 September, Burke scored his first Bradford City and first senior goal in a 2–1 away win against Oldham Athletic. His loan was extended on 18 September for a further month and for a further month in October. In November he returned briefly to West Ham for treatment on a knee injury but returned to Bradford where his loan was extended until 2 January 2016. On 26 April 2016, Burke won a total of seven awards at Bradford City's end of season awards, including the Player of the Year award.

Loan to Wigan Athletic

Having already appeared for West Ham in their short-lived Europa League campaign at the beginning of the 2016–17 season, on 30 August 2016, Burke signed on loan for Championship team, Wigan Athletic for the remainder of the season. He scored his first goal for Wigan in a 2–1 win over Huddersfield Town on 28 November 2016.

Loan to Bolton Wanderers

On 1 August 2017, Burke, along with West Ham teammate Josh Cullen, joined Bolton Wanderers on loan until the following January.

Return to West Ham
Burke returned to West Ham in January 2018 and was immediately included in the squad for the FA Cup 3rd round tie at Shrewsbury Town which finished 0–0. He also started the replay at London Stadium on 16 January scoring the only goal of the game in extra time – his first senior goal for the club.

Return to Bolton Wanderers

On 31 January 2018, Burke returned to Bolton on loan.

Hull City
In July 2018, Burke joined Hull City for an undisclosed fee, believed to be £1.5 million. He signed a three-year contract with the Yorkshire club. He made his debut in the first match of the 2018–19 season on 6 August 2018 at home to Aston Villa in a 1–3 defeat. Burke scored his first goal for Hull in the FA Cup first round match on 7 November 2020 against Fleetwood Town helping them to a 2–0 win.

Luton Town
On 2 June 2021, Burke signed a contract with Luton Town to join the club at the end of the month. He signed on a free transfer.

Career statistics

Honours

Hull City
EFL League One Champions 2020–21

Individual
West Ham United Young Player of the Year: 2014–15
Bradford City Player of the Year: 2015–2016

References

External links

England profile at The FA

1996 births
Living people
Footballers from the London Borough of Newham
English footballers
England youth international footballers
Association football defenders
West Ham United F.C. players
Premier League players
Bradford City A.F.C. players
Wigan Athletic F.C. players
Bolton Wanderers F.C. players
Hull City A.F.C. players
Luton Town F.C. players
English Football League players